Józef Joachim Goldtmann (21 March 1782 – 22 March 1853) was a bishop of the Diocese of Sandomierz.

Goldtmann was born on 21 March 1782 to Charles and Francisca Goldtmann in Wejherowo; he would be baptized the same day. In 1804, Goldtmann entered the seminary in Łowicz. He would be ordained a priest in 1806. In addition, he would be appointed canon for the cathedral of the Diocese of Włocławek in  1824 and officiant of the diocese in 1825.

On 15 September 1838, Goldtmann was consecrated bishop of Włocławek and titular bishop of Carystus; he would begin his term on 17 September. He would be transferred to the Diocese of Sandomierz in 1844.

In 1848, Goldtmann was awarded the Order of Saint Anna, 1st Class.

References

1782 births
1853 deaths
People from Wejherowo